Fabian Michaels is a paralympic athlete from South Africa competing mainly in category T35 throwing events.

Fabian Michaels competed in all three throws at the 2004 Summer Paralympics and even showed his versatility by running a leg of the South African 4 × 100 m relay team, but it was in the javelin that he won a silver medal.

References

Paralympic athletes of South Africa
Athletes (track and field) at the 2004 Summer Paralympics
Paralympic silver medalists for South Africa
Living people
Medalists at the 2004 Summer Paralympics
Year of birth missing (living people)
Paralympic medalists in athletics (track and field)
South African male javelin throwers
20th-century South African people
21st-century South African people